The České středohoří, also known as Central Bohemian Uplands or Central Bohemian Highlands, is a geomorphological region in northern Bohemia of the Czech Republic.

Geography
The region is about 80 km long, extending from Česká Lípa in the northeast to Louny in the southwest and from Litoměřice in the south to Děčín in the north, and is intersected by the river Elbe. The mountains, which are of volcanic origin, have distinctively sharp solitary peaks.

Protection
The eponymous protected landscape area covers most of the uplands' territory; consequently, construction through the area of the D8 motorway (part of European route E55 between Dresden and Prague) was very controversial. Despite this, the motorway was finally completed in December 2016.

Gallery

See also
The Czech Rock

References

External links

 www.ceskestredohori.cz

Mountain ranges of the Czech Republic